Ascend (stylised as ASCEND) is the third studio album by American DJ and producer Illenium, released on August 16, 2019, through Astralwerks, making it his major-label debut and his only album on the label. The album features six singles.

Background
Consisting of 17 songs, the album includes six previously released singles, "Take You Down", "Crashing", "Pray", "Good Things Fall Apart", "Takeaway", and "Blood". On his social media accounts, he announced the release date of the album and the following tour on June 12.

Promotion
The first single "Take You Down" was released on August 3, 2018. The song brought forth the drug abuse problem Illenium previously had.
The second single "Crashing", featuring Bahari, was released on January 25, 2019.
The third single "Pray", featuring Kameron Alexander, was released on March 22, 2019.
The fourth single "Good Things Fall Apart", with Jon Bellion, was released on May 13, 2019.
The fifth single "Takeaway", with The Chainsmokers and featuring Lennon Stella, was released on July 24, 2019.
The sixth and last single before the album release "Blood", featuring Foy Vance, was released on August 2, 2019.

Critical reception

Accolades

Track listing

Notes
  signifies a co-producer
  signifies an additional producer
  signifies a vocal producer

Charts

Weekly charts

Year-end charts

Certifications

Release history

References

2019 albums
Illenium albums
Astralwerks albums